Aomori 1st district (青森県第1区, Aomori-ken dai-ikku or simply 青森1区, Aomori-ikku) is a single-member constituency of the House of Representatives in the national Diet of Japan. It is located in Northern Aomori and covers the cities of Aomori, Mutsu and the Higashitsugaru and Kitatsugaru districts along with the northern half of the Kamikita District.

Before the introduction of parallel voting and single-member districts, Aomori city and East Tsugaru county had been part of the four-member Aomori 1st district.

Aomori is a "conservative kingdom", a Liberal Democratic stronghold; but in the landslide 2009 election Hokuto Yokoyama, center-left supported gubernatorial candidate in 2003, could win the 1st district and became the first Democrat to win a district in Aomori by beating Jun Tsushima from the Tsushima writer-politician dynasty from Kanagi town (in present-day Goshogawara). Tsushima had tried to succeed his retiring father, LDP faction leader Yūji Tsushima. Other members of the family included Representative, Councillor and Governor Bunji Tsushima (Seiyūkai/LDP – Aomori), Representative Kichirō Tazawa (LDP – Aomori), Representative Kyōichi Tsushima (LDP/DPJ – Tōhoku), Representative, Peer and Kanagi mayor Gen'emon Tsushima (Seiyūkai – Aomori), Kanagi mayor Eiji Tsushima and writers Shūji Tsushima (Osamu Dazai), Yūko Tsushima, Shizuko Ōta and Haruko Ōta. The second "inheritance" attempt in 2012 was successful.

List of representatives

Election results

References 

Aomori Prefecture
Districts of the House of Representatives (Japan)